Yahel Ernesto Castillo Huerta (born June 6 1987) is a Mexican diver.

References

External links
 

1987 births
Living people
Mexican male divers
Divers at the 2007 Pan American Games
Divers at the 2008 Summer Olympics
Divers at the 2011 Pan American Games
Divers at the 2012 Summer Olympics
Olympic divers of Mexico
Sportspeople from Guadalajara, Jalisco
World Aquatics Championships medalists in diving
Pan American Games gold medalists for Mexico
Pan American Games medalists in diving
Universiade medalists in diving
Universiade silver medalists for Mexico
Divers at the 2019 Pan American Games
Medalists at the 2009 Summer Universiade
Medalists at the 2013 Summer Universiade
Medalists at the 2011 Pan American Games
Medalists at the 2019 Pan American Games
Divers at the 2020 Summer Olympics
21st-century Mexican people
20th-century Mexican people